The 2003 World Men's Handball Championship took place in Portugal from 20 January to 2 February 2003. It was the 18th edition of the World Championship in team handball and Croatia won the championship.

Qualification

First round

Group A

Group B

Group C

Group D

Second round

Group I

Group II

Group III

Group IV

Final round

5–8th place semifinals

Semifinals

7th place game

5th place game

Third place game

Final

Final standings

Awards
MVP:  Christian Schwarzer

All Star Team
Goalkeeper:  Henning Fritz
Left Wing:  Eduard Koksharov
Left Back:  Carlos Pérez
Center Back:  Enric Masip
Pivot :  Christian Schwarzer
Right Back:   Patrick Cazal
Right Wing:  Mirza Džomba

Statistics

Top goalscorers

Top goalkeepers

Medalists

External links
XVI Men's World Championship at IHF.info

World Handball Championship tournaments
W
H
H
Hanball
Handball
Sports competitions in Lisbon
2000s in Lisbon
Sport in Guimarães
Sport in Viseu
Sport in Madeira
Sport in São João da Madeira
Sport in Caminha
Sport in Póvoa de Varzim
Sport in Rio Maior
Sport in Espinho, Portugal